Garve railway station is a railway station on the Kyle of Lochalsh Line, serving the village of Garve in the north of Scotland. Garve is located at the eastern edge of Loch Garve, measured  from Dingwall, and is the first stop on the line before Lochluichart. ScotRail, who manage the station, operate all services.

History 

The station was opened on 19 August 1870. It was to be the junction for the Garve and Ullapool Railway, intended to connect Ullapool, the Western Isles' nearest mainland port, with the rest of the UK. An act of parliament was passed for the line in 1890, but in spite of local efforts in that year, and again two years later, the idea could not be fully financed and was abandoned.

Facilities 
Facilities here are basic, comprising shelters and benches, and a small car park (as well as bike racks). There is step-free access to both platforms, but not between them (as only a footbridge connects them).

Platform layout 

Passenger volume 

The statistics cover twelve month periods that start in April.

Services 
There is one service in each direction on Sundays all year, with a second during the summer months only.

References

Bibliography

External links 

Railway stations in Highland (council area)
Railway stations served by ScotRail
Railway stations in Great Britain opened in 1870
Former Highland Railway stations